The Rajasthan Basin is a sedimentary basin located in the north west part of India. The Rajasthan Basin unconfirmably lies over Precambrian basement rocks.

Petroleum reserves
Huge reserves of naturally occurring hydrocarbons are expected in clastic and carbonate reservoirs in Cambrian to Paleocene sequences like limestone and shales capped by intra formational shales and tight limestones. Oil and Natural Gas Corporation (ONGC), Oil India Limited and Focus energy are some of major petroleum companies in this basin.

Sub-divisions
The Rajasthan Basin has been further divided into three sub-basins.

 Jaisalmer sub basin or Jaisalmer basin
 Bikaner Nagaur sub basin or BNG basin (after Bikaner Nagaur and Ganganagar, town of Rajasthan)
 Barmer Sanchor sub basin.

Bikaner nagaur sub basin is separated from Jaisalmer basin by pokaran high while DEvikot Nachna uplift separates Barmer Sanchor sub basin from Jaislmer sub basin.

References

RAJASTHAN BASIN
DGH India RAJASTHAN BASIN

Sedimentary basins of Asia
Geology of Rajasthan